John Armstrong was a rugby league footballer in the New South Wales Rugby League (NSWRL) Competition.

After representing New South Wales (NSW) at a junior level Armstrong began his senior career playing for the Western Suburbs (1964–65) (1967–70) club. Originally a  Armstrong developed into a tough, uncompromising . Armstrong also played for the Canterbury-Bankstown (1971) and Eastern Suburbs (1972–73) clubs. Armstrong was a member of Easts 1972 Grand Final side that was beaten by Manly-Warringah, he had a try disallowed in the controversial decider.

Armstrong, in total, played 137 1st grade matches in the NSWRL competition before moving to Brisbane to play out his career with the Wests club.

The front-rower was a hotelier by profession and at the time of his death managed several hotels.

References

Sources
The Encyclopedia of Rugby League Players; Alan Whiticker & Glen Hudson
Rugby League Yearbook; Dave Middleton

External links
Bulldogs profile

Australian rugby league players
Sydney Roosters players
Western Suburbs Magpies players
Canterbury-Bankstown Bulldogs players
Wests Panthers players
Year of birth unknown
Year of death unknown
Rugby league players from New South Wales